Nectandra pulchra is a species of plant in the family Lauraceae. It is endemic to Haiti.  It is threatened by habitat loss.

References

pulchra
Endemic flora of Haiti
Taxonomy articles created by Polbot